Several vessels have been named Ariadne for  Ariadne, a goddess in Greek mythology.

Mercantile
 was launched at Whitby. Two years later a new owner shifted her registry to London. She then made one voyage for the British East India Company. On her return she sailed on between England and the West Indies. She is last listed in 1811.
 was built in 1795 at Newbury , Massachusetts. She became a Liverpool-based slave ship in 1801. A French or Dutch privateer captured her in 1804, but a Liverpool-based vessel had recaptured her. Then in 1806 a French privateer captured her and took her into Guadeloupe
, launched as MS Tor Hollandia, a ferry in service 1975–99
, later MS Moby Tommy, a ferry in service 2002–06

Naval
, a Germany naval ship, launched 1871
, a Gazelle-class light cruiser of the Imperial German Navy, launched in 1900
, the name of several ships of the Royal Navy

Ship names